Lennox Julian (born 28 May 1983) is an Antiguan and Barbudan footballer, currently playing for Bassa FC in the Antigua and Barbuda Premier Division.

International career
Nicknamed Fox, Julian made his debut for Antigua and Barbuda in a February 2004 FIFA World Cup qualification match against the Netherlands Antilles and has earned nearly 20 caps since. He played in 4 FIFA World Cup qualification games.

National team statistics

International goals
Scores and results list Antigua and Barbuda's goal tally first.

References

External links
 

1983 births
Living people
Antigua and Barbuda footballers
Antigua and Barbuda international footballers
Association football midfielders